Zabrotes subnitens is a species of leaf beetle in the family Chrysomelidae. It is found in North America.

References

Bruchinae
Articles created by Qbugbot
Beetles described in 1885